Diceratella is a genus of flowering plants belonging to the family Brassicaceae.

Its native range is Northeastern Tropical Africa to Kenya, Southern Iran.

Species:

Diceratella alata 
Diceratella canescens 
Diceratella elliptica 
Diceratella floccosa 
Diceratella incana 
Diceratella inermis 
Diceratella psilotrichoides 
Diceratella revoilii 
Diceratella smithii

References

Brassicaceae
Brassicaceae genera